Nelson Phillips (May 3, 1873 – March 31, 1939) was a justice of the Texas Supreme Court from April 1912 to November 1921, serving as chief justice from June 1915 to November 1921.

Born  in Jefferson, Texas, Phillips' father was a veteran of the Confederate States Army. The family moved to Hillsboro, Texas, where Phillips "attended local schools until the age of fifteen" before spending two years at Bingham Military School in Mebane, North Carolina. In 1894 he began reading law in the office of Thomas Slater Smith, gaining admission to the bar the following year.

In 1904, Governor S. W. T. Lanham gave Phillips a two-year appointment to a seat on the Eighteenth Judicial District of Texas. After its expiration, Phillips moved to Dallas to practice law.

In 1911, Governor Oscar Branch Colquitt appointed Phillips to a seat on the Texas Supreme Court vacated by the resignation of William F. Ramsey. Phillips served as an associate justice from April 1912 to November 1921, and then served as chief justice from June 1915 until his resignation in November 1921. Phillips then returned to private practice in Dallas until his death.

References

Justices of the Texas Supreme Court
1873 births
1939 deaths
U.S. state supreme court judges admitted to the practice of law by reading law